This is a timeline documenting the events of heavy metal in the year 1974.

Newly formed bands 
 The Angels
Baker Gurvitz Army
Bijelo Dugme
Drugi način
George Thorogood and the Destroyers
 Helix
 Krokus
 Moxy
 Ñu
Point Blank 
 Praying Mantis
 The Ramones
Streetwalkers
38 Special 
 Raven
 Stress
 Y&T

Reformed bands 
 Iron Butterfly
 Steppenwolf

Albums

February

March

April

May

June

September

October

November

December

Unknown 
Montrose - Paper Money

Events 
 The drummer John Rutsey of Rush is let go due to health issues  and Neil Peart joins as a permanent member.

References 

1970s in heavy metal music
Metal